Carla Jéssica Pereira Nunes (born 8 June 1991) is a Brazilian footballer who plays as a forward for São Paulo.

Club career
Nunes, playing for Palmeiras, finished as the top goalscorer in the 2020 Campeonato Brasileiro de Futebol Feminino Série A1 with 12 goals. At the point of leaving Palmeiras, she was the club's record goalscorer in all competitions with 34 goals in 49 matches. Nunes joined São Paulo on 18 January 2021, a club that she had previously played for in 2015.

References

1991 births
Living people
Women's association football forwards
Brazilian women's footballers
People from Valinhos
Campeonato Brasileiro de Futebol Feminino Série A1 players
São Paulo FC (women) players
Sociedade Esportiva Palmeiras (women) players
Footballers from São Paulo (state)